Psiloteredo megotara is a species of saltwater clam, a  marine bivalve mollusc in the family Teredinidae, the shipworms.

Distribution
North Atlantic, Mediterranean Sea.

References

Molluscs described in 1848
Teredinidae